Houda Miled (Arabic: هدى ميلاد; born 8 February 1987 in Kairouan, Tunisia) is Tunisian judoka. She represented her country in two Summer Olympics: in 2008 in the 78kg event (where she lost her first match to Stéphanie Possamaï) and in 2012 in the 70 kg event (where she lost her first match to Chen Fei). Miled won a bronze medal at the 2009 World Judo Championships and has been dominant at the African Judo Championships where she has won the gold medal every year between 2005 and 2012 with the exception of the 2009 tournament where she won the bronze.

References

External links
 
 

1987 births
Living people
Tunisian female judoka
Judoka at the 2008 Summer Olympics
Judoka at the 2012 Summer Olympics
Judoka at the 2016 Summer Olympics
Olympic judoka of Tunisia
People from Kairouan
Mediterranean Games silver medalists for Tunisia
Competitors at the 2009 Mediterranean Games
African Games gold medalists for Tunisia
African Games medalists in judo
Mediterranean Games medalists in judo
Competitors at the 2007 All-Africa Games
Competitors at the 2011 All-Africa Games
21st-century Tunisian women
20th-century Tunisian women